KPEN-FM is a commercial radio station in Soldotna, Alaska, broadcasting  to the Kenai, Alaska, area on 101.7 FM.

KPEN-FM airs a country music format.

KPEN-FM was originally a San Francisco radio station which began broadcasting on October 27, 1957. Following a series of tests, the Federal Communications Commission (FCC) authorized KPEN to become the first station west of the Mississippi River to transmit in multiplex stereo, August 10, 1961. The station was later sold and became known as KIOI.

Another SF Bay Area station, originally known as KPGM, adopted the KPEN call letters in December 1969, one month after they became available. That station, located in Los Altos, CA, broadcasting on 97.7 FM, was not related to the San Francisco station. It had broadcast studios at the San Antonio center with transmitters west of El Monte avenue in Santa Clara county California in 1975 they moved  out of the San Antonio center to the (now defunct) Old Mill Mall in Mountain View, CA.

References

External links

PEN-FM
Country radio stations in the United States
Radio stations established in 1985
1985 establishments in Alaska